White City is a retail park on Chester Road in Old Trafford, Greater Manchester, England. At the southeast corner of the docks area and southeast of Manchester United's ground, it is the site of the former Manchester Botanic Gardens which hosted the Art Treasures Exhibition of 1857. The gateway of the Botanic Gardens still stands at the edge of the retail park. During its history, White City has also been the site of an amusement park and a sports stadium for athletics, greyhound and stock car racing.

History of the site
In 1827 the Botanical and Horticultural Society was founded in Manchester to encourage the study of botany and horticulture.  The society built a botanical garden on the site covering .  The site was chosen by John Dalton for the society as it was down-wind of pollution from the city. The land, which was owned by Thomas de Trafford, was leased to the society at a price of the society's choosing.

The gardens featured a complex of plant houses and a conservatory that was built by Clarke and Jones of Birmingham. The buildings were heated by a system of hot water flowing through pipes. The Grade II listed gateway that still faces Chester Road was the entrance to the gardens.

In 1857 the gardens hosted the Art Treasures Exhibition which was opened by Prince Albert. The exhibition was visited by 1.3million visitors in 142-days. A further exhibition was held in 1887 to celebrate Queen Victoria's Golden Jubilee. This exhibition attracted 4.74 million people over 192-days.

By the end of the 19th century, interest in the gardens was waning as the wealthy were moving away from the city centre. In 1907, part of the garden's site was leased to White City Limited, a company set up by Heathcote and Brown. The company opened the "White City Amusement Park" on the site on 20 May 1907.

The remaining  was sold to Canine Sports Ltd on 1 November 1927 for the construction of a stadium. The site held its first motorcycle speedway race on 16 July 1928. With the stadium being completed and greyhound racing starting in 1930. In July 1953, a 6-lane cinder track for athletics was made. The stadium was sold to a developer at the end of 1981, it was left vacant, fell into disrepair and closed in 1982.

Stadium

The stadium ran as a greyhound track from 1927 until 1982, speedway from 1928 to 1932 and stock cars from 1972 to 1982.

References
Notes

Bibliography

See also 
 Art Treasures Exhibition, Manchester 1857
 Botanical Gardens Cricket Ground
 Royal Jubilee Exhibition, Manchester 1887

Buildings and structures in Trafford
Retail parks in the United Kingdom
Defunct amusement parks in the United Kingdom
Defunct amusement parks in England
Stretford
Sports venues completed in 1928
World's fair sites in England
1928 establishments in England